Josephine is a 2001 English-language Croatian film directed by Rajko Grlić. It was shown at several international film festivals in 2001, but was never released to theatres as the production company filed for bankruptcy during the film's post-production.

Plot
Jan (Miroslav Vladyka) is a poor but knowledgeable Czech cheesemaker. In 1991, the borders of Czechoslovakia are opened, and Jan goes west to fulfill his father's dream – meet and sleep with a girl who resembles Josephine Baker. He arrives in Hamburg, where he ends up forced to live in a brothel owned by formed actor Spike (Giancarlo Esposito), and falls in love with East German dancer Al (Maria Schrader).

Cast
  as Jan
 Maria Schrader as Al
 Giancarlo Esposito as Spike
 Tery Ferman as Josephine
 Marina Anna Eich as dancer
 Shahina Williams as Pep
 Andrea Bozó as Ninel

Release
Indigo, the film's German production company, went bankrupt during post-production; hence, Josephine was never shown in theatres. The only screening of the film in Croatia was at the 2002 Motovun Film Festival, to a lukewarm reception from the critics. According to Grlić, another German film company managed to acquire the rights to distribute the film in 2010. In the interim, he states, the film was shown (in breach of copyright laws) on many film festivals throughout the world.

References

External links

Josephine at hrfilm.hr 

2001 films
English-language Croatian films
Films directed by Rajko Grlić
Films set in 1991
Unreleased films
Films set in Hamburg
2000s English-language films